The Japanese ukiyo-e artist Kitagawa Utamaro made a number of prints depicting ama divers—women whose work is to dive for shellfish or pearls—catching haliotis abalone sea snails.

Utamaro's heir  published the triptych Enoshima Awabi-ryō no Zu ("Catching abalone in Enomshima") in the early 19th century, signed Utamaro.



Background

Ukiyo-e art flourished in Japan during the Edo period from the 17th to 19th centuries, and took as its primary subjects courtesans, kabuki actors, and others associated with the "floating world" lifestyle of the pleasure districts. Alongside paintings, mass-produced woodblock prints were a major form of the genre. In the mid-18th century full-colour  prints became common, printed using a large number of woodblocks, one for each colour.

Kitagawa Utamaro (–1806) made his name in the 1790s with his bijin ōkubi-e ("large-headed pictures of beautiful women") portraits, focusing on the head and upper torso.  He experimented with line, colour, and printing techniques to bring out subtle differences in the features, expressions, and backdrops of subjects from a wide variety of class and background.  Utamaro's individuated beauties were in sharp contrast to the stereotyped, idealized images that had been the norm.

Ama

Ama divers have for two thousand years practised their trade of diving for shellfish, seaweed, and pearls off the coasts of Japan.  Traditionally they dive naked except for a waistcloth and a cord with one end above the water.  They also carry a knife to pry open shells.  Ama once numbered many thousands, but by the beginning of the 21st century only about a thousand remained.  Though depicted in their youth in ukiyo-e pictures, the ama was a lifetime job that continued into the woman's fities.

Ama were known for their coarse manners, and their work coarsened their skin.  This was in great contrast to the geishas and courtesans who were normally the subject of ukiyo-e art—their manners were refined, they dressed elegantly, they immersed themselves in high art and culture, and they commanded high prices for their services.  The ama were perceived as less feminine, but socially and sexually free.  Utamaro and others played with these contrasts, portraying ama in elegant, resting poses as they often did with geisha, but nude and unkempt in their work environment.  While Utamaro's supple, energetic, and vigorously healthy ama come across in a way erotic, his depictions of them differ from his often sexually explicit shunga.  It has been speculated such prints of women who appeared nude in broad daylight may have arisen in reaction to government suppression of shunga.

Utamakura print No. 1

Utamakura ("poem[s] of the pillow") is a book of 12 erotic prints attributed to Utamaro, published in 1788.

The first print depicts a pair of kappa river creatures raping an ama diver underwater.  Her hair flows with the running current, and small, seemingly curious fish swim near.  Another ama watches seated on a rock with an ashamed look, her right hand held to her mouth.  Her drenched, dishevelled hair sticks to her.  She wears a red waistcloth, but her genitals can still be seen.  To the French art critic Edmond de Goncourt she "appear[s] languid and susceptible to temptation.

Utamaro employs a varied contrast of tones in the area of the rocks, while fine lines of the running current partially obscure the underwater scene.  Careful attention goes to the individual strands of the women's hair.  The amas in this picture demonstrate the manner in which he depicted them in future prints.

Awabi-tori

Three vertical ōban prints of about  each make up the first Awabi-tori triptych.  They are signed Utamaro ga ("picture by Utamaro") and were published  by Tsuruya Kiemon's firm Senkakudō.

The scene depicts a group of women on a rocky shore watching ama divers.  In a boat to the left, two women undress while another in the central print helps a swimming colleague.  Another swimming ama appears in the right print.  The swimmers appear small and thin, their bodies enveloped in their wet hair.  The French art critic Edmond de Goncourt compares these firgure to traditional Japanese representations of "dead souls coming to haunt the earth".

The rocks appear to be Manaita-iwa ("Chopping-block Rocks") in Enoshima in what is now Kanagawa Prefecture.  In that case, the women on the rocks are likely pilgrims on their way to Enoshima Shrine to worship the deity Benten.  The shrine displayed its treasures every six years; one of these displays was in 1791, and Utamaro may have produced this image about 1790 in anticipation of the event.

Awabi-tori

The three prints make up a triptych when placed together. The prints are nishiki-e "brocade prints"—multicolour woodblock prints made with pigments on hand-made washi paper. They were published . Each sheet is signed Utamaro hitsu ("the brush of Utamaro"). The publisher is unknown, and there is no censor's seal, which has raised speculation as to how acceptable what the picture depicts was at the time.

Utamaro depicts a group of nude ama divers finishing a day of diving for haliotis abalone sea snails.  He draws them naturalistically, without elongation or other distortions that ukiyo-e artists typically employed to present ideal models of beauty.  They are tall with white skin and long, stringy black hair that is wet and dangles from them.  They appear soft-skinned and the contours of their exposed upper bodies have reddish outlines, emphasizing their strong, corporeal figures at physical labour.  The scenery is made up of light greens and other pale colours, which contrast with the red clothes several of the figures wear.

In the left print, a nude woman with a red waistcloth wrapped around her lower body crouches, supporting herself with her hands on the ground behind her and lowering one leg in the water.  A woman standing beside her points towards the water; she is lightly sunburned.  A woman in patterned blue in the central print combs her wet hair while breastfeeding a child clad in an apron; Utamaro often depicted women breastfeeding.  In the right print a woman wrings the end of a red waistcloth tied around her waist while holding in her mouth a knife used for opening shells. She looks behind herself to the viewer's right, where a crouched woman selects shellfish from a basket to buy.

A kyōka poem appears on the right print that reads:

 
 
 More tempting than the flesh of the abalone is the skin of the diver

Goncourt considered the prints "images of a very high style, and they have a charm which is arresting, surprising, even astonishing".

Enoshima Yūryō Awabi-tori no Zu

Utamaro employs a simple line in delineating the well-proportioned corporeality of the bodies and the undulations of the waves.

Enoshima Awabi-ryō no Zu

Utamaro's heir  had the triptych Enoshima Awabi-ryō no Zu ("Catching abalone in Enomshima") published in the Bunka era (1804–18) by either Kagaya Kichiemon or Yorozuya Kichibei.

Utamaro II makes a mitate-e parody of abalone hunting in Enoshima, where the fishing was done not by women but men (also called ama, but spelt with the characters , "sea-man").  The picture depicts nude female ama ("sea-woman") divers hunting for abalone as luxuriously-dressed women watch from a boat.

Notes

References

Works cited

 
 
 
 
 
 
 
 
 
 
 
 
 
 
 
 

1797 prints
1798 prints
Works by Kitagawa Utamaro